Kudara (Khüderi) is a rural locality (a selo) in Kabansky District, Republic of Buryatia, Russia. The population was 2,058 as of 2010. There are 21 streets.

Geography 
Kudara is located 47 km north of Kabansk (the district's administrative centre) by road. Korsakovo is the nearest rural locality.

References 

Rural localities in Kabansky District